Glennia is a monotypic, Neotropical, genus of butterflies in the family Pieridae. Its sole species is Glennia pylotis (Godart, 1819).

References

Pierini
Pieridae of South America
Monotypic butterfly genera
Taxa named by Alexander Barrett Klots
Pieridae genera